Quzhou Airport, also called Quzhou Air Base  is a dual-use military and civil airport located 2.9 kilometers east of the city of Quzhou in Zhejiang Province, China. Originally only a military airfield for the People's Liberation Army Air Force, the airport was first expanded for use by American bombers during World War II, and was later occupied by Japanese troops. A small passenger terminal opened to commercial flights on 26 November 1993, though expanded commercial use of the airport has been hampered by continued heavy military presence due to the airport's proximity to the East China Sea and Taiwan Strait. Airlines operating out of Quzhou Airport generally operate medium to large narrow-body aircraft, such as the Boeing 737. Quzhou's commercial passenger terminal is unique in being separated from the airport's two aircraft bays by a lake, requiring passengers to walk across a lengthy causeway before boarding. The airport serves as the base of operations for regional carrier Quzhou Airlines.

History

World War II 
Originally known as Hangzhou Air Base, in 1937 the facility was renamed Quzhou Air Base. Following the Japanese attack on Pearl Harbor in the winter of 1941, the airport began a major expansion for future use by United States Army Air Forces. The airport's strategic location played a key role in World War II, with American aircraft frequenting the base for replenishment. In April 1942 the base was to serve as the refueling point for the Doolittle Raiders following the strike on Tokyo, however because of incliment weather, all of them ran out of fuel prior to reaching the base, instead crash landing around the city of Quzhou. Chinese support from Quzhou drove the Japanese to launch the battle of Zhejiang and Jiangxi to suppress the airbase, with Japanese troops taking control of the base on June 3, 1942.

First Taiwan Strait Crisis 

In the early hours of June 23, 1956, Lu Min, then-commander of the 34th Regiment, 12th Air Division of the PLAAF, took off from Quzhou Airport with a MiG-17 fighter jet and shot down a Republic of China Air Force B-17 Flying Fortress over the Guangfeng and Shangrao areas of Jiangxi province, marking the first time PLAAF air defenses managed to shoot down an enemy at night.

Military use 
Located 500 km from Taiwan just at the edge of effective cruise missile and airstrike range, Quzhou is one of the largest and most important air bases of the PLAAF. The airport is fitted with a hardened underground hangar to protect aircraft from adversaries.

The facility is home to the 29th Fighter Division, which flies the Sukhoi Su-30MKK, and the 85th Fighter Brigade, equipped with the Chengdu J-20 stealth fighter.

Civilian use
The airport has a 1,900 meter (8,200 ft) runway (class 4C) and a 3,440 square-meter terminal building. The airport can accommodate Boeing 737 and other medium to large narrow-body passenger aircraft. The passenger terminal building is 3,440 square meters, which can support 200 passengers during peak hours.

Airlines and destinations

See also
List of airports in China
List of the busiest airports in China
List of People's Liberation Army Air Force airbases

References

Airports in Zhejiang
Chinese Air Force bases
Airports established in 1993
1993 establishments in China